Klim Alekseevich Shipenko (born 16 June 1983) is a Russian film director, screenwriter, actor and producer.

Biography

Early life
Shipenko was born in Moscow, Russian SFSR, Soviet Union (now Russia). 
In 2002 he entered the California State University at Northridge (Film Production Department). Filmed the diploma film as a cameraman. Studied at the Sal Dano Professional Actors Workshop. In 2004 he returned to Moscow. For a short time he worked on Channel One, was the director of the Plantain program about cars.

Career

Filming in outer space
In 2021, Shipenko shot portions of a science fiction film aboard the International Space Station. It is to be the second narrative feature-length fiction film shot (partially) in space (after Return from Orbit), and it is the first feature-length fiction film to be filmed in space by professional film-makers. The project is tentatively called The Challenge, and was shot between the launch of Soyuz MS-19 and return of Soyuz MS-18. The first narrative film filmed fully (the narrative film Return from Orbit had some scenes filmed in space) in outer space was a short film titled Apogee of Fear, shot in 2008. The Challenge was in a race with Tom Cruise and Doug Liman to shoot the first narrative feature film in space. On the ISS Shipenko was in charge of camera, lighting, sound recording and makeup. The acting was done by actress Yulia Peresild. The filming equipment was launched at Progress MS-17 and returned on Soyuz MS-18. Pyotr Dubrov and Mark Vande Hei helped with filming.

Filmography

As director
 Night Express (2006)
 White Night (2006)
 Unforgivens (2009)
 1000 Kilometers from My Life (2010)
 Who Am I? (2010)
 It's Simple (2012)
 Love Does Not Love (2014)
 The Nerd's Confession (2016)
 Salyut 7 (2017)
 Text (2019)
 Serf (2019)
 December (2021)
 The Challenge (2023)

As screenwriter
 Night Express (2006)
 White Night (2006)
 Unforgivens (2009)
 1000 Kilometers from My Life (2010)
 Who Am I? (2010)
 It's Simple (2012)
 Love Does Not Love (2014)
 Salyut 7 (2017)
 December (2023
)

As actor
 Unforgivens (2009)
 It's Simple (2012)
 Salyut 7 (2017)

As producer
 White Night (2006)
 Night Express (2006)
 It's Simple'' (2012)

Notes

References

External links

Living people
1983 births
People from Moscow
Cosmonauts from Moscow
Russian film directors
Russian film producers
Russian screenwriters
21st-century Russian screenwriters
California State University, Northridge alumni
Spaceflight participants